Mário Cesariny de Vasconcelos or Mário Cesariny (August 9, 1923 – November 26, 2006) was a Portuguese surrealist poet and painter. He published several major works of poetry during a career spanning 50 years. Cesariny was also a painter, but his work became more centered on poetry in the 1950s.

Early life
Mário Cesariny was born in Lisbon, Portugal, the youngest child and only son of Viriato de Vasconcelos and María de las Mercedes Cesariny, a Spaniard of French but originally Italian ancestry.

Education 
Mário Cesariny studied in the prestigious Escola de Artes Decorativas António Arroio and also studied music with the composer Fernando Lopes Graça. Later he joined the Académie de la Grande Chaumière in Paris, where he met André Breton in 1947. He soon became influenced by the French surrealist movement and was one of the biggest supporters of the movement in Portugal, where he founded the Lisbon Surrealist Movement with other Portuguese artists including Alexandre O'Neill and José-Augusto França and where he met João Artur da Silva.

After being acquainted with the surrealist movement, Cesariny moved away from the neorealist movement, important at the time in the country for being composed mainly by members of the resistance against the fascist leaning regime of Oliveira Salazar. He adopted an attitude of constant experimenting in his work. This principle is the main characteristic of his work and has been present throughout his career.

From 1960 until April 25, 1974, Cesariny was mercilessly harassed by the Portuguese Polícia Judiciária for being a suspect of vagrancy, a euphemistic term used by the police in those days for homosexuality, which the poet lived courageously in spite of persecution. This fact shows up several times in his writings in a veiled way ("Lisboa-os-Sustos") and was one of the causes of his intermittent stayings in Great Britain and France during the 1960s and 1970s. Later he talked publicly about this.

Works
 1950 — 
 1952 — 
 1953 — 
 1956 — 
 1957 — 
 1958 — 
 1959 — 
 1961 — 
 1961 — 
 1964 — 
 1965 — 
 1972 — 
 1980 — 
 1994 —

Notes

External links
Perve Gallery Exhibitions - Paintings, Draws and Objects
Interview
Some poems
Interview
Page on MCV
Page on MCV
Autografia, film about Mário Cesariny
Article in IPLB
Poems in Poetry International Web
Last interview (audio)
Genealogy

1923 births
2006 deaths
Gay poets
Gay painters
Portuguese LGBT painters
Portuguese LGBT poets
Portuguese gay writers
Portuguese gay artists
People from Lisbon
20th-century Portuguese poets
Portuguese male poets
Portuguese surrealist writers
Deaths from cancer in Portugal
Alumni of the Académie de la Grande Chaumière
20th-century Portuguese painters
20th-century Portuguese male artists
20th-century Portuguese male writers
Portuguese male painters
Portuguese people of Italian descent
20th-century Portuguese LGBT people